Lake Rotoiti is a lake in the Bay of Plenty region of New Zealand. It is the northwesternmost in a chain of lakes formed within the Okataina Caldera. The lake is close to the northern shore of its more famous neighbour, Lake Rotorua, and is connected to it via the Ohau Channel. It drains to the Kaituna River, which flows into the Bay of Plenty near Maketu.

The full name of the lake is Te Rotoiti-kite-a-Īhenga, which in the Māori language means "The Small Lake Discovered By Īhenga",  the Māori explorer also credited with discovering Lake Rotorua. Legend says that the lake was named as such because when Ihenga first saw it, he was only able to see a small part of it and thought the lake was a lot smaller.

Since the 1960s, the quality of lake water has been negatively affected by inflows of nitrogen rich water from Lake Rotorua, agricultural run-off from surrounding farms and seepage from domestic septic tanks. The effects of this included an almost permanent algal bloom in the Okere arm of the lake and choking lake weed growth in other still areas of the lake. A barrier to divert the nutrient rich waters of Lake Rotorua into the Kaituna River was completed in late 2008.

The Bay of Plenty Regional Council expected to see improvement in lake water quality within five years  and the Rotorua Te Arawa Lakes Program reported in 2013 that the intervention has significantly improved water quality. Water quality is the highest it has been in decades, on track to meet targets set by the Program to meet community expectations.

Lake Rotoiti has thermal hot-spring baths on the southern shore which are accessible by boat.

Geology
Its joint drainage with Lake Rotorua through the Ohau Channel depends upon the sinking Tikitere graben which is also very geothermally active on the south eastern margins of the lake. The Rotoiti eruptive vents are at the eastern end of the lake and define the north western margins of the Haroharo Caldera in the Ōkataina Caldera.
 What is not now challenged is that this was a paired eruption with a nearby vent in the Ōkataina Caldera that had a separate magma source and erupted Earthquake Flat breccia.

References

Lakes of the Bay of Plenty Region
Okataina Volcanic Centre
Volcanic crater lakes